Klaus Gerwien (11 September 1940 – 3 September 2018) was a German footballer. He spent ten seasons in the Bundesliga with Eintracht Braunschweig. He also represented Germany six times, including a 1970 FIFA World Cup qualifier against Cyprus and five friendlies (he scored an equalizer in a 2–2 tie against Brazil in 1968).

References

External links
 

1940 births
2018 deaths
People from Ełk
People from East Prussia
Sportspeople from Warmian-Masurian Voivodeship
German footballers
Germany under-21 international footballers
Germany international footballers
VfL Wolfsburg players
Eintracht Braunschweig players
Bundesliga players
Association football forwards